Billiken is a weekly children's magazine published in Buenos Aires, Argentina, the oldest Spanish language magazine for young people. It was created by the Uruguayan journalist Constancio C. Vigil and its first issue appeared on November 17 of 1919.

History 
Billiken was founded by Constancio C. Vigil, a Uruguayan-born journalist who also founded El Gráfico. Its current director is Juan Carlos Porras. The first edition of the magazine appeared on November 17, 1919. One of the cartoonists that worked for Billiken was Manuel García Ferré, with his character Pi Pío.

The name Billiken is taken from a popular charm doll of the time, a smiling Buddha-like deity created in 1908 by the American art teacher and illustrator Florence Pretz. To Constancio C. Vigil, who was looking for a title for his unpublished children's magazine, it seemed like a good idea to use the name of a doll that Argentine children believed could bring you good luck.

The cover of issue No. 1 had a boy with a football under his right arm, and a bandage on his head that covered his left eye. This image of the disheveled "neighborhood child" was the emblem of the magazine for several decades.

Billiken has its headquarters in Buenos Aires. The publisher of the magazine is Editorial Atlántida S.A. The magazine targets school-age children and contains a mixture of games, stories, cartoons and news about movies, music and celebrities. Characters made popular in the magazine include 'The Travelling Ant', 'Marta and Jorge' and 'Misia Pepa'.

Billiken is widely available in Uruguay, Argentina and other South American countries.

The circulation of Billiken was 58,816 copies in 2010, 54,373 copies in 2011 and 54,064 copies in 2012.

Controversy 
In August 1978, the magazine asked its readers to send postcards abroad that defended the National Reorganization Process from criticism of the human rights violations that were being committed.

References

External links
 
 

Children's magazines
Magazines established in 1919
1919 establishments in Argentina
Magazines published in Buenos Aires
Spanish-language magazines
Weekly magazines